Marblehead may refer to:

Places in the United States
 Marblehead, Illinois
 Marblehead, Massachusetts
 Marblehead, Ohio
 Marblehead, Wisconsin

Other uses
 Marblehead to Halifax Ocean Race, a biannual sailing race on the North Atlantic
 USS Marblehead, several United States warships named after Marblehead, Massachusetts

See also
 Marblehead Light (disambiguation)
 
 Marble Head, an historic house in Maryland, United States